Indian Wells (formerly, Homestead) is an unincorporated community in Kern County, California.

References

Populated places in the Mojave Desert
Unincorporated communities in Kern County, California
Unincorporated communities in California